is a former Japanese football player.

Playing career
Takagi was born in Kanazawa on July 1, 1982. He joined J1 League club JEF United Ichihara from youth team in 2001. However he could not play at all in the match behind Ryo Kushino until 2003. In October 2003, he moved to Regional Leagues club Thespa Kusatsu. In 2004, he moved to J2 League club Omiya Ardija. However he could not play at all in the match behind Hiroki Aratani. In 2006, he moved to J2 club Thespa Kusatsu again on loan. He became a regular goalkeeper and played full time in all 48 matches. In 2007, he moved to J2 club Consadole Sapporo on loan. He player as regular goalkeeper and the club won the champions in 2007 and was promoted to J1 from 2008. In 2008, he battles with Yuya Sato for the position and played many matches. However the club finished at bottom place and was relegated to J2 in a year. In 2009, he returned to J1 club Omiya Ardija. However he could hardly play in the match behind Koji Ezumi. In 2010, he moved to J1 club Albirex Niigata. However he could not play at all in the match behind Masaaki Higashiguchi and Takaya Kurokawa. In 2011, he moved to J2 club Consadole Sapporo again. However he could hardly play in the match behind Lee Ho-seung in 2011. Although the club was promoted to J1 from 2012, he could hardly play in the match and the club was relegated to J2 in a year. In 2013, he moved to J2 club FC Gifu. Although he battles with Shogo Tokihisa for the position and played many matches in 2013, he could not play at all in the match behind new member Yoshikatsu Kawaguchi in 2014. In 2015, he moved to J3 League club SC Sagamihara. However he could not play at all in the match behind Tsuyoshi Sato and retired end of 2015 season.

Club statistics

References

External links

1982 births
Living people
Association football people from Ishikawa Prefecture
Japanese footballers
J1 League players
J2 League players
J3 League players
JEF United Chiba players
Thespakusatsu Gunma players
Omiya Ardija players
Hokkaido Consadole Sapporo players
Albirex Niigata players
FC Gifu players
SC Sagamihara players
Association football goalkeepers